Tom Root (born September 20, 1973) is an American writer, producer, director and voice actor for Robot Chicken.

Early life
Root was born in Iowa City, Iowa. He attended Central Michigan University, graduating with a degree in journalism. While at CMU, Root edited the student newspaper CM Life.

Career
Root was one of the original staffers of ToyFare magazine, and was a staff writer and copy editor for Wizard Entertainment's family of publications. While at ToyFare he was a co-writer of the magazine's 's popular Twisted ToyFare Theatre feature.

Root co-wrote Writers on Comics Scriptwriting, vol. 2, with Andrew Kardon in 2004. He also wrote Archie Comics' 200th issue of Jughead in 2010.

Root and Robot Chicken co-creator Matthew Senreich created the Adult Swim series Titan Maximum which premiered on September 27, 2009. He was a writer on Lucasfilm's Star Wars Detours animated series. Root also wrote The Simpsons' Robot Chicken-style animated opening in 2013.

Filmography 
Tom Root's production company is called Tom is Awesome and produces many television shows, seen in the table below.

References

External links 

 
 Interview on G4

Living people
1973 births
American male television actors
American television directors
American television producers
American television writers
Annie Award winners
American male television writers
American male voice actors
Central Michigan University alumni
Primetime Emmy Award winners
21st-century American screenwriters
21st-century American male writers